Atomic is the third studio album by the American rock band Lit, released on October 16, 2001 by Dirty Martini and RCA Records. It peaked at #36 on the US Billboard 200.

Track listing

Tracks released as non-LP B-sides
 "The Party's Over"
 "Chain of Fools" (Aretha Franklin) (added as a bonus track in the European edition)
 "I Wanna Rock" (Twisted Sister)
 "Father Christmas" (The Kinks)
 "Happy in the Meantime” (Remix)

Personnel
Lit
 A. Jay Popoff – lead vocals 
 Jeremy Popoff – guitar, backing vocals
 Kevin Baldes – bass
 Allen Shellenberger – drums

Additional personnel
 James Ehreinger – organ 
 Don Gilmore – background vocals
 Gabrial McNair – synthesizer 
 Steven Tyler – background vocals 
 Danny Walker – additional lead guitar

Bonus CD
A limited edition release of Atomic had a bonus disc with three tracks by bands from Lit's Dirty Martini label.
 Lit - "Down” (Acoustic) – 3:46
 Handsome Devil - "Makin' Money" (clean version) (Walker) – 3:30
 The Color Red - "Sore Throat" (demo version) (Meyer, Schartoff, The Color Red, Verloop, J. Zamora, M. Zamora) – 5:52

References

External links

Lit (band) albums
2001 albums
RCA Records albums